Italy's healthcare system is consistently ranked among the best in the world. Life expectancy is the 4th highest among OECD countries (83.4 years in 2018) and the world's 8th highest according to the WHO (82.8 years in 2018). Healthcare spending accounted for 9.7% of GDP in 2020.

The Italian state runs a universal public healthcare system since 1978. However, healthcare is provided to all citizens and residents by a mixed public-private system. The public part is the Servizio Sanitario Nazionale, which is organised under the Ministry of Health and administered on a devolved regional basis.

History
After World War II, Italy re-established its social security system including a social health insurance administered by sickness funds and private insurances. In the 1970s the social health insurance faced severe equity problems as coverage differed between the sickness funds, around 7% of the population remained uninsured, especially in the South. Moreover, sickness funds went practically bankrupt by the mid-1970s. Due to growing public dissatisfaction with the existing healthcare system, Italian policymakers led by the Christian-Democrats instituted structural reform. In 1978, the government established the SSN (Servizio Sanitario Nazionale or National Health Service) including universal coverage for the whole population financed through tax funding, while private health continued to exist but was reserved for those who were willing to pay for extra services or services not offered by the SSN, such as dentistry or psychology.

National Health Service
 
The National Health Service was created in 1978. Healthcare is provided to all citizens and residents by a mixed public-private system. The public part is the national health service, Servizio Sanitario Nazionale (SSN), which is organized under the Ministry of Health and is administered on a regional basis.

Family doctors are entirely paid by the SSN, must offer visiting time at least five days a week and have a limit of 1500 patients. Patients can choose and change their GP, subjected to availability.

Prescription drugs can be acquired only if prescribed by a doctor. If prescribed by the family doctor, they are generally subsidized, requiring only a copay that depends on the medicine type and on the patient income (in many regions all the prescribed drugs are free for the poor). Over-the-counter drugs are paid out-of-pocket. Both prescription and over-the-counter drugs can only be sold in specialized shops (farmacia).  In a sample of 13 developed countries, Italy was sixth in its population weighted usage of medication in 14 classes in 2009 and fifth in 2013. The drugs studied were selected on the basis that the conditions treated had a high incidence, prevalence and/or mortality, caused significant long-term morbidity and incurred high levels of expenditure and significant developments in prevention or treatment had been made in the last 10 years. The study noted considerable difficulties in cross-border comparison of medication use.

Visits by specialist doctors or diagnostic tests are provided by the public hospitals or by private ones with contracts to provide services through the national health service, and if prescribed by the family doctor require only a copay (of the order of $40 for a visit without any diagnostic test) and are free for the poor. Waiting times are usually up to a few months in the big public facilities and up to a few weeks in the small private facilities with contracts to provide services through the national health service, though the referring doctor can shorten the waiting times of the more urgent cases by prioritising them.

Performance
Surgeries and hospitalization provided by public hospitals or by conventioned private ones are completely free of charge for everyone, regardless of their income.

The Italian National Outcomes Programme permits measurement of variation in the quality and outcomes of care by region, which is very considerable.  So, for example, the proportion of patients receiving coronary angioplasty within 48 hours of a heart attack varies from  about 15% in some regions, such as Marche, Molise and Basilicata to nearly 50% in the northern regions Valle d’Aosta and Liguria.  Measured at Local Health Authority level the levels varied between 5% and more than 60%. This geographic variability was the greatest of any of the 11 countries studied by the OECD. There is evidence of internal patient movement probably driven by a search for better quality care generally from the poorer and less developed southern regions to the more prosperous north.

Emergency medicine

The emergency medical services in Italy currently consist primarily of a combination of volunteers and private companies providing ambulance service, supplemented by physicians and nurses who perform all Advanced Life Support procedures. The primary emergency telephone number for emergency medical service in Italy is still 118, since the European emergency number (112) doesn't work in many regions yet. Emergency medical service is always free of charge. First aid is provided by all the public hospitals: for urgent cases it is completely free of charge for everyone (even for an undocumented non-citizen), while a copay (about $35) is sometimes asked for non-urgent cases.

See also
 Health in Italy
 Emergency medical services in Italy
 Associazione Volontari Italiani Sangue

References

External links
 Italy - Information by World Health Organization
 Ministry of Health in Italy